The Palace Cave is located at Flores Department, not far away from Trinidad, Uruguay.

History 
The rocks in which the cave is formed date to the Late Cretaceous and is composed of sandstone, which  during the Paleocene.

It was first studied in 1877; in the early 20th century, it was explored by Dr. Karl Walter.

The cave has been subject of the creation of a geopark. UNESCO is considering it as a possible World Heritage Site, due to its interest as a Geopark.

The Palace Cave is featured in the coat of arms of Flores Department.

References

External links 

 Gruta del Palacio 
 Uruguay's first geopark

Caves of Uruguay
Cretaceous Uruguay
Protected areas of Uruguay
Landforms of Flores Department